Tyroglyphites is a genus of mites in the family Acaridae.

Species
 Tyroglyphites miocenicus Pampaloni, 1902

References

Acaridae